"Same to You, Pal" is the final episode of American late-night comedy television series The Colbert Report is the 1,447th episode of the series overall and is part of the eleventh season. The final episode of The Colbert Report originally aired in the United States on December 18, 2014, on Comedy Central. In the episode Stephen becomes immortal after accidentally killing "Grimmy" during the opening of the segment of "Cheating Death with Dr. Stephen T. Colbert, D.F.A.". This leads to Stephen singing "We'll Meet Again" in its entirety along with a large crowd of several recognizable figures, before meeting with Santa Claus, Abraham Lincoln, and Alex Trebek on the roof of the studio.

In April 2014 Stephen Colbert was chosen to replace David Letterman as the host of Late Show on CBS. It was announced that day that The Colbert Report would conclude in December 2014, and Colbert would be retiring his conservative character when he hosts The Late Show with Stephen Colbert, which premiered on September 8, 2015. Colbert said in advance, before the final week of the show aired, that it would be a special week "like every other week". The final episode was the highest-rated episode of the series ever, and was the number one show on cable in its time slot. The final episode received generally positive reception including several tributes and positive reviews from critics.

Synopsis
The episode opens during the ending of the December 18, 2014, episode of The Daily Show with Jon Stewart checking in with Stephen to "toss over" the show (a discontinued practice used earlier in the series run). Colbert does not directly acknowledge it being the final episode, but he quickly has Jimmy start The Colbert Report, abruptly ending The Daily Show without closing credits or a Moment of Zen. He started the show with a quip: “If this is your first time tuning into The Colbert Report, I have some terrible news.”

The first segment begins with a news story about a truck from Mark I Plumbing now being used as an anti-aircraft gun in Syria. Colbert continues by announcing the winners of the auction for his desk and fireplace set from the show's one-on-one interview area, which collectively accumulated a total of $313,420 for the Yellow Ribbon Fund and DonorsChoose. He then starts the final installment of "The Wørd" segment with "Same To You, Pal", including a series of clips features memorable moments and ventures done by Stephen over the past nine years.

After returning from a commercial break, Stephen begins the final installment of "Cheating Death with Dr. Stephen T. Colbert, D.F.A." The opening of the segment deviates right away when "Grimmy" tries to kill Stephen after watching him cheat in their chess match. Colbert draws his pistol Sweetness and kills "Grimmy" on the spot, throwing his pistol into the crowd with a fan getting it, leaving him without a guest and making him immortal. Returning from a commercial break Stephen explains he was going to say goodbye before ending the series, but now that he has become immortal, he realizes it would be meaningless and begins singing the song "We'll Meet Again." Soon after he starts singing he is immediately joined by Jon Stewart, as the song proceeds the studio continues to fill rapidly with several recognizable figures who have been involved in the show throughout its run.

After the song ends, the studio is now empty, with a painting without Stephen Colbert, and Stephen is on the roof of the studio questioning what he should do now. Santa Claus' sleigh suddenly lands in front of him; Santa is accompanied by a unicorn-hybrid Abraham Lincoln, and Alex Trebek, "the man with all the answers".  Stephen agrees to join them, but worries that this means he will be gone forever. Trebek assures Stephen that they will always be there for the American people, when they need them the most.

The episode ends with Colbert thanking everyone involved in the show throughout the run, and he calls upon Mavis Staples to help do so. Signing off with the words, "From Eternity, I'm Stephen Colbert," he then throws the show back to Jon Stewart, paying homage to his character's beginnings on The Daily Show and hinting that the entire series was just a nine-year-long correspondent segment. Jon thanks Stephen for the report and introduces the Moment of Zen, which is a previously unaired clip of Stewart checking in with Colbert from June 3, 2010. After being told that the said footage will not be used on air, Stewart says, "let's go back into our funny characters ... Stephen, what are you doing?" To which Colbert mockingly replies, "Hi Jon, I'm getting angry at liberals". The show's closing credits were played out with the song "Holland, 1945" by Neutral Milk Hotel instead of the usual theme. He picked the song in honor of his father and two brothers who died in a plane crash.

Background
In 2012 Comedy Central renewed Jon Stewart's contract to host The Daily Show through the end of 2015 and Stephen Colbert's contract to host The Colbert Report through the end of 2014. Colbert intentionally had his contract synced up with David Letterman's contract to host Late Show with David Letterman on CBS, so they would both expire at the same time; so that in the event Letterman chose to retire Colbert would be available to take over the show. On April 3, 2014, Letterman announced on his show that he would retire in 2015.

One week later on April 10, 2014, it was announced that Colbert was chosen to replace Letterman as the host of Late Show on CBS beginning in 2015. It was also announced that The Colbert Report would conclude at the end of 2014, and that Colbert will not be using his conservative character on Late Show. Comedy Central soon released a statement saying "Comedy Central is proud that the incredibly talented Stephen Colbert has been part of our family for nearly two decades. We look forward to the next eight months of the ground-breaking Colbert Report and wish Stephen the very best".

Following the announcement, Colbert  made a special surprise appearance in character on the April 23, 2014, episode of The Daily Show to announce that it has become clear to him that he has "won television" and changed the world, the goal he originally set out to do, and thus no longer feels the need to continue. He expressed interest in taking over Late Show after Letterman retires but couldn't because "they already gave it to some fat guy". In subsequent episodes following the announcement Colbert never directly mentioned moving to CBS (with the exception of a few subtle jokes alluding to it), differentiating the real world Colbert from the character. On the July 30, 2014, episode, actor James Franco tried unsuccessfully to get Colbert to break character by mentioning the upcoming show.

The Late Show with Stephen Colbert premiered on September 8, 2015. The Colbert Report was replaced on Comedy Central by The Nightly Show with Larry Wilmore hosted by Larry Wilmore, a contributor for The Daily Show. The Nightly Show with Larry Wilmore premiered on January 19, 2015.

Production and broadcast
When commenting on the final week of The Colbert Report Colbert stated "Our last week of shows are going to be really special, just like every other week".

The closing credits offer an apology to Doris Kearns Goodwin (as part of a running gag on the series), and feature the song "Holland, 1945" by Neutral Milk Hotel, as a tribute to Colbert's father and two of his older brothers, Peter and Paul, who were killed in the crash of Eastern Air Lines Flight 212 when he was 10 years old.

The final episode originally aired in the United States on Thursday, December 18, 2014, at 11:30 (EST), where the show has aired throughout the entire run. Earlier that same day Comedy Central aired an all day marathon featuring archived episodes from the show's run leading up to the final episode, with a break in the marathon for that night's episode of The Daily Show.

Cameos
During the episode Colbert sings the 1939 song "We'll Meet Again" in its entirety alongside a large group a recognizable figures, most of which had previously made guest appearances on the show. The group featured celebrities, musicians, political figures, television personalities, film directors, news anchors, journalists, people involved in the military, writers, activists, and other prominent people not in the aforementioned categories. The crowd also featured the staff of the show, members of Colbert's family, and fictional characters. The majority of the crowd assembled inside the studio, while others were pre-taped in advance.

 Jon Stewart, television host, host of  The Daily Show
 Randy Newman, musician (on piano) 
 Jeff Daniels, actor
 Sam Waterston, actor
 Keith Olbermann, sports and political host and commentator 
 David Remnick, journalist
 Tom Brokaw, news anchor
 Katie Couric, journalist
 Charlie Rose, television host
 Ken Burns, documentary film director
 Lil Buck, dancer
 Ric Ocasek, musician
 David Hallberg, ballet dancer
 Trevor Potter, political figure, legal counsel for Colbert Super PAC 
 Senator Cory Booker (D-NJ) 
 Senator Claire McCaskill (D-MO) 
 Bryan Cranston, actor
 Tim Meadows, actor (portrayer of P.K. Winsome) (SNL alumnus) 
 Alexi Lalas, soccer player
 Jonathan Batiste, musician (would go on to be Colbert's bandleader on The Late Show)
 Cookie Monster, character from Sesame Street
 Big Bird, character from Sesame Street 
 James Franco, actor
 George Saunders, author
 Dean Kamen, entrepreneur
 Toby Keith, musician
 Lesley Stahl, journalist
 Jake Tapper, journalist
 Jeffrey Toobin, lawyer, legal analyst
 Neil DeGrasse Tyson, astrophysicist 
 Peter Frampton, musician
 Andy Cohen, television personality
 Christiane Amanpour, journalist
 Gen. Raymond T. Odierno, Army Chief of Staff
 Grover Norquist, political figure
 David Gregory, journalist
 Willie Nelson, musician 
 Doris Kearns Goodwin, historian 
 Matt Taibbi, journalist
 Bing West, author
 Brian Greene, theoretical physicist
 Mandy Patinkin, actor
 Cyndi Lauper, musician
 Yo-Yo Ma, cellist
 Andrew Young, politician
 Andrew Sullivan, blogger
 Michael Stipe, musician
 Francis Collins, physician-geneticist
 Samantha Power, US Ambassador to the United Nations
 Kareem Abdul-Jabbar, former NBA player
 Barry Manilow, musician
 Mayor Bill de Blasio (D-New York City)
 Jeff Tweedy, musician
 Patrick Stewart, actor
 Stone Phillips, television reporter (first guest)
 Joe Quesada, comic book editor
 Cass Sunstein, legal scholar
 Arianna Huffington, Huffington Post founder
 Garrett Reisman, astronaut
 Jimmy Wales, co-founder of Wikipedia
 Maureen Dowd, columnist
 Richard Clarke, counter-terrorism expert/analyst
 Alan Alda, actor
 George Lucas, film director
 Henry Kissinger, diplomat
 Mark Hamill, actor
 Elijah Wood, actor
 Terry Gross, NPR host
 Norm Ornstein, political scientist
 Jim Cramer, television personality
 Ed Viesturs, corporate speaker
 Shepard Fairey, street artist
 Emily Bazelon, journalist
 David Leonhardt, journalist
 Bo Dietl, former detective
 Mike Huckabee (R-AR), politician, former Governor (Who Made Huckabee?) 
 Robert Pinsky, poet
 Gloria Steinem, feminist intellectual
 Del. Eleanor Holmes Norton (D-DC) 
 Bob Costas, sportscaster
 Nate Silver, political prognosticator
 Dan Savage, gay rights activist
 Eliot Spitzer (D-NY), politician, former Governor
 Thomas Friedman, journalist
 Mark Cuban, businessman
 Paul Krugman, economist
 Steven Pinker, psychologist
 Jim Martin, Jesuit priest
 Jonathan Alter, journalist
 George Church, geneticist
 Pussy Riot, musicians (taped) 
 Vince Gilligan, television creator (taped) 
 Bill Clinton, 42nd President of the United States (taped) 
 J. J. Abrams, film director (taped) 
 U.S. soldiers in Afghanistan (taped) 
 Staff members outside of Studio (taped)
 Tek Jansen, The Colbert Report character (animated) 
 Esteban Colberto, The Colbert Report character (taped) 
 Terry W. Virts, astronaut (taped on COLBERT) 
 Evelyn Colbert, Colbert's wife
 Madeleine Colbert, Colbert's daughter
 John Colbert, Colbert's son
 Peter Colbert, Colbert's son
 Smaug, character from The Hobbit film series (CGI) 
 Alex Trebek, television host

Reception

Ratings
The episode was watched by 2.481 million viewers on its initial broadcast, making it the most watched episode ever in the show's history. The finale was the most watched cable program of the night in its time slot, beating The Daily Show, which was seen by 2.032 million viewers.

Tributes
Chris Hardwick paid tribute to Colbert in that night's episode of @midnight, which aired immediately after this final episode on the same network. Hardwick opened the show by showing a clip from the November 6, 2014, episode of @midnight in which Colbert had made a special appearance. In Colbert's honor Hardwick asked his guests to name the "three most American words they can think of" as the first game.

Critical reception
The show was well received by critics and fans alike. As of 2022, the episode has an average IMDB rating of 8.5 compared to its overall 9-year series rating of 8.4.

Because Colbert had already booked in his slot on The Late Show with Stephen Colbert, the episode's finale blended facetious sentimentality with genuine tribute (such as Colbert's use of Neutral Milk Hotel's "Holland, 1945" in tribute to his dead family members, which was admired by critics).

The Guardian wrote, "It was the perfect way to say goodbye, with his narcissistic character riding off into the great beyond, to live forever in the minds and actions of his fans."

References

External links
 Episode Guide from official site
 

The Colbert Report
2014 American television episodes
Colbert Report
Television episodes about personifications of death
Musical television episodes
Santa Claus in television
December 2014 events in the United States